Cantharomyces is a genus of about 30 species of fungi in the family Laboulbeniaceae.

Species

C. abbrevia
C. ancyrophori
C. andinus
C. aploderi
C. aquaticus
C. bledii
C. bordei
C. bruchii
C. chilensis
C. denigratus
C. elongatus
C. exiguus
C. flagellatus
C. haytiensis
C. italicus
C. japonicus
C. magellanicus
C. numidicus
C. occidentalis
C. orientalis
C. pacei
C. permasculus
C. platensis
C. platystethi
C. pusillus
C. robustus
C. thaxteri
C. trogophloei
C. valdivianus
C. vene

References

Laboulbeniaceae
Laboulbeniales genera